Stenorhopalus macer is a species of beetle in the family Cerambycidae. It was described by Newman in 1840.

References

Beetles described in 1840
Taxa named by Edward Newman
Necydalinae